The Knockout Stage of the 1998 Fed Cup Europe/Africa Zone Group I was the final stage of the Zonal Competition involving teams from Europe and Africa. Those that qualified for this stage placed first and second in their respective pools.

The eight teams were then randomly drawn into two two-stage knockout tournaments, with the winners advancing to the World Group II Play-offs.

Draw

Semifinals

Belarus vs. Ukraine

Portugal vs. South Africa

Poland vs. Greece

Romania vs. Sweden

Finals

Belarus vs. South Africa 

  advanced to the World Group II Play-offs, where they were drawn against . They won 4–1, and thus proceeded to the 1999 World Group II.

Poland vs. Romania 

  advanced to the World Group II Play-offs, where they were drawn against . They lost 0–5, and thus fell back to Group I in 1999.

See also
Fed Cup structure

References

External links
 Fed Cup website

1998 Fed Cup Europe/Africa Zone